Peter Alexander Magrini (born June 8, 1942 in San Francisco, California) was an American right-handed pitcher in Major League Baseball who played for the  Boston Red Sox. The ,  Magrini attended Santa Clara University, where he struck out Willie Mays during an exhibition game against the San Francisco Giants.

After a stellar 18–8 record and a 2.26 earned run average in the 1965 Double-A Eastern League, Magrini made his Major League debut for the Red Sox on April 13,  against the Baltimore Orioles, going two innings and giving up two hits, two bases on balls and three earned runs. He made his only MLB start in his final game May 9 against the Kansas City Athletics but lasted only three innings and lost his only big-league decision, 6–1.

However, Magrini contributed to Boston's surprise  American League pennant when he was traded with fellow pitcher Ron Klimkowski to the New York Yankees for veteran catcher Elston Howard on August 3, 1967.  Howard helped guide the young Red Sox pitching staff through a five-team pennant scramble and the 1967 World Series.

Magrini retired from baseball after the 1969 minor league season and lived in Santa Rosa, California.

External links

1942 births
Living people
Baseball players from San Francisco
Boston Red Sox players
Charlotte Hornets (baseball) players
Major League Baseball pitchers
Pittsfield Red Sox players
Santa Clara Broncos baseball players
Syracuse Chiefs players
Toronto Maple Leafs (International League) players
Wilson Tobs players